Deep Core is a futuristic platform game developed by Dynafield Systems for the Amiga. It was published in 1993 by International Computer Entertainment. Captain Dawnrazer has been sent to save an underwater nuclear research base which has been invaded by strange aliens. Dawnrazer must work himself through nine levels (with additional sublevels and bonus levels). The game includes six weapon which can be upgraded via power-ups.

External links
 Deep Core at Lemon Amiga

Amiga games
Amiga CD32 games
1993 video games
Platform games
Video games developed in Sweden